Where the Heart Is is a British television drama series created by Ashley Pharoah and Vicky Featherstone, originally produced by United Productions in association with Anglia Television, later, Meridian Broadcasting, and finally, entirely by Granada Television in its final year. It was commissioned for ITV and premiered on 6 April 1997, lasting ten series and 110 episodes, concluding on 10 September 2006.

The series initially centres on the personal and professional lives of two district nurses, Peggy Snow (Pam Ferris) and Ruth Goddard (Sarah Lancashire) in the fictional town of Skelthwaite, a close-knit community in Yorkshire. Following their departures, the series shifted focus to the residents of the town. Filming of the show took place in Colne Valley in West Yorkshire, mainly within the villages of Marsden, Slaithwaite, the town of Meltham, and occasionally the Town Hall in Huddersfield.

Series overview

Episodes

Series 1 (1997)

Series 2 (1998)

Series 3 (1999)

Series 4 (2000)

Series 5 (2001)

Series 6 (2002)

Series 7 (2003)

Series 8 (2004)

Series 9 (2005)

Series 10 (2006)

References

Where the Heart Is